Ṣafar also spelt as Safer in Turkish, is the second month of the lunar Islamic calendar. The Arabic word ṣafar means "travel, migration", corresponding to the pre-Islamic Arabian time period when Muslims flee the oppression of Quraish in Mecca and travelled (most of the them barefooted)to Madina.

Most of the Islamic months were named according to ancient Arabian weather conditions; however, since the calendar is lunar, the months shift by about 11 days every solar year, meaning that these conditions do not necessarily correspond to the name of the month.

Timing
The Islamic calendar is a purely lunar calendar, and its months begin when the first crescent of a new moon is sighted. Since the Islamic lunar year is 11 to 12 days shorter than the solar year, Safar migrates throughout the seasons. The estimated start and end dates for Safar are as follows (based on the Umm al-Qura calendar of Saudi Arabia):

Islamic events
 01 Safar 61 AH, prisoners of Karbalā entered Yazid's Palace in Syria
 10 Safar 61 AH, death of Sakina bint Husayn, youngest daughter of Hussain ibn Ali and a prisoner of Karbalā
 17  Safar 202 AH, martyrdom of Ali al-Ridha according to one tradition
 18 Safar, Grand Magal pilgrimage is celebrated at Touba, Senegal, commemorating the departure of Cheikh Ahmadou Bamba
 18, 19 and 20 Safar, Death Anniversary (urs) of Ali Hajveri is celebrated at Data Darbar, Lahore
 Every 20 or 21 Safar, Arba'een or Chehlum (the 40th day after Ashura) 
 27 Safar 1 AH, Migration was started (Hijrah) from Mecca to Medina by Muhammad with Abu Bakr
 27 Safar 589 AH, death of Salahuddin al-Ayyubi
 28 Safar 11 AH, Muhammad fell deathly ill
 28 Safar 50 AH, Martyrdom of Imam Hasan ibn ‘Alī, grandson of Muhammad

References

External links
 Islamic-Western Calendar Converter (Based on the Arithmetical or Tabular Calendar)

2
Islamic terminology